Juan Manuel Barrientos Valencia (born June 16, 1983) is a Colombian chef, businessman, and advocate of peace. He is also the founder of the El Cielo restaurant chain, which has been studied by various universities. He has been named one of the 50 best chefs of Latin America, and was awarded the Revelation Chef Award by Madrid Fusion.

Advocate of Peace 
Juan Manuel was recognized by the Colombian government as a “Young Leader of Peace in Latin America”. He has taken his cuisine to areas of major conflict in Colombia, and has offered his experience and help to wounded soldiers and young guerrillas. His newest project is translated as “In El Cielo, we are cooking up peace in Colombia” (“En El Cielo, estamos cocinando la paz de Colombia”).

References

External links 
 Restaurant El Cielo

Living people
Restaurateurs
Colombian chefs
People from Medellín
1983 births